Pristimantis lanthanites is a species of frog in the family Strabomantidae.
It is found in Brazil, Colombia, Ecuador, and Peru.
Its natural habitats are tropical moist lowland forests and moist montane forests.

References

lanthanites
Amphibians of Brazil
Amphibians of Colombia
Amphibians of Ecuador
Amphibians of Peru
Taxonomy articles created by Polbot